Kate Read may refer to:

Kate Read, a character on Arthur
Kate Read, a contestant in series 1 of The Voice UK

See also
Kate Reid